Jiří Brožek (born March 11, 1947) is a Czech film editor.

Biography 
During 1967‒1973 he attended Editing and Directing at FAMU. Then he started to work in Barrandov Movie Studios, from 1976 Brožek is self-employed. During the career he edited more than 100 feature films, variety of the TV production and many TV series.

He cooperated with Ladislav Smoljak (Ball Lightning, Waiter, Scarper!, Jára Cimrman Lying, Sleeping) Karel Kachyňa (Love Between the Raindrops, Forbidden Dreams), Jiří Menzel (Cutting It Short, The Snowdrop Festival, My Sweet Little Village), Věra Chytilová (Calamity, Wolf's Hole) or Václav Havel (Leaving).

Jiří Brožek was awarded nine Czech Lions for films  Krvavý román (1993), Sekal Has to Die (1998), Anděl Exit (2000), Boredom in Brno (2003), The City of the Sun (2005), Pleasant Moments (2006), ...a bude hůř (2007), Leaving (2011) and Filthy (2017), twice he gained Slovak film award Slnko v sieti for The City of the Sun (2006) and Gypsy (2012). He is a member of Czech Film and Television Academy (ČFTA) and honourable member of Slovak Film and Television Academy (SFTA).

He is married and has three children.

Filmography

Editor

Actor

Cooperation

References

External links 

 
 Jiří Brožek on FDb.cz (czech)
 Jiří Brožek on ČSFD.cz (czech)
 Jiří Brožek on Kinobox.cz (czech)

1947 births
Living people
Academy of Performing Arts in Prague alumni
Czech film editors
People from Roudnice nad Labem
Sun in a Net Awards winners